Andy Ogilvie (born January 3, 1965) is a former professional lacrosse player.  He played for the Buffalo Bandits, Vancouver Ravens and Calgary Roughnecks in the National Lacrosse League.  His NLL career lasted from 1999 to 2007.  He was inducted into the Canadian Lacrosse Hall of Fame in 2014 along with Gary Gait and Paul Gait.

Ogilvie was born in Peterborough, Ontario. In Ogilvie's career, he won the Mann Cup three times (1989 and 1991 with New Westminster Salmonbellies, 2001 with Coquitlam Adanacs , the Minto Cup twice (1983, 1986), the world box lacrosse championships once, and a bronze at the 1994 world field lacrosse championships.

Awards
top OLA junior A defender: 1986
WLA playoff MVP: 1989, 1991
WLA regular season MVP: 1993
Mike Kelly Memorial Trophy (Mann Cup series MVP): 2001

Statistics

NLL
Reference:

References

1965 births
Living people
Buffalo Bandits players
Calgary Roughnecks players
Canadian lacrosse players
Lacrosse defenders
Lacrosse people from Ontario
Sportspeople from Peterborough, Ontario
Vancouver Ravens players